Cynthia Leitich Smith (born 1967) is a New York Times best-selling  author of fiction for children and young adults. A member of the Muscogee Creek Nation, she writes fiction for children centered on the lives of modern-day Native Americans. These books are taught widely by teachers in elementary, middle school, high school, and college classrooms. In addition, Smith writes fanciful, humorous picture books and gothic fantasies for ages 14-up. Regarded as an expert in children's-YA literature by the press, she also hosts a website for Children's Literature Resources.
Smith is a current faculty member at Vermont College of Fine Arts, teaching in the Writing for Children and Young Adults MFA program. She was named the inaugural Katherine Paterson Chair in 2020. In addition, she was the winner of the 2021 NSK Neustadt Prize for Children’s Literature.

Smith, a graduate of the University of Kansas and The University of Michigan Law School, lives in Austin, Texas.

Selected texts

Jingle Dancer 
Jingle Dancer,  illustrated by Cornelius Van Wright and Ying-Hwa Hu, is a picture book for ages 4 and up. Published in 2000 by Morrow/HarperCollins, the book was a finalist for the Oklahoma Book Award, a runner-up for the Western Writers of America Storyteller Award, and is listed as a Notable Children's Trade Book in the Field of Social Studies, on the 2002 Texas 2x2 list, and on the 2002 Michigan Reader's Choice Award List.

Rain Is Not My Indian Name 
Rain Is Not My Indian Name  is a realistic novel for ages 10 and up. Upon its publication by HarperCollins, Smith was recognized as 2001 Writer of the Year by Wordcraft Circle of Native Writers and Storytellers. Like Jingle Dancer, it was a finalist for the Oklahoma Book Award. An audio book version of this title is available from Listening Library/Random House.

Indian Shoes 
Indian Shoes  is a chapter book for ages 7 and up. Published in 2002 by HarperCollins, it was selected for inclusion on the NEA Native American Book List. It is also listed as a Notable Children's Trade Book in the Field of Social Studies, the 2003 Best Children's Books of the Year by Bank Street College of Education, and Choices 2003 by the Cooperative Children's Book Center.

Santa Knows 
Santa Knows, also by Greg Leitich Smith and illustrated by Steve Bjorkman, is a humorous holiday picture book, published in 2006 by Dutton, for ages 4 and up. In 2006, it was included among "Holiday High Notes" by the Horn Book, "Worthy Stories for the Holidays" by the Miami Herald, and cheered as a "newly minted winner" by Kirkus Reviews.

Tantalize 
Tantalize is a young adult gothic fantasy novel, published in 2007 and 2008 by Candlewick Press, for ages 14 and up. Fantasy elements include vampires and shapeshifters. The novel is a genre bender, employing elements of mystery, suspense, comedy, romance, and gothic fantasy. It was also published in 2008 by Listening Library/Random House, Walker Books U.K., Walker Books Australia and New Zealand, and Editions Intervista in France. Tantalize was named to the 2011 list of Popular Paperbacks by the Young Adult Library Services Association and featured at the 2007 National Book Festival in Washington, D.C.

Eternal 
Eternal is a young adult gothic fantasy novel, published in 2009 and 2010 by Candlewick Press, for ages 14 and up. Fantasy elements include angels, vampires and shapeshifters. The novel is a genre bender, employing elements of mystery, suspense, comedy, romance, and Gothic fantasy. It also was published by Listening Library/Random House, Walker Books U.K., Walker Books Australia and New Zealand, and Amber in Poland. The U.S. paperback edition debuted at #5 on the New York Times best-seller list (children's paperbacks) and #13 on the Publishers Weekly best-seller list.

Holler Loudly 
Holler Loudly, illustrated by Barry Gott, is a humorous tall tale picture book, published in 2010 by Dutton, for ages 4 and up. Holler Loudly was featured at the 2010 Texas Book Festival and was a Dolly Parton's Imagination Library selection.

Blessed 
Blessed is a young adult gothic fantasy novel, published in 2011 by Candlewick Press, for ages 14 and up. Fantasy elements include angels, vampires, and shapeshifters. The novel is a genre bender, employing elements of mystery, suspense, comedy, romance, and gothic fantasy. It also was published by Walker Books Australia and New Zealand  and Walker U.K. Blessed was a YALSA Teens Top 10 nominee.

Tantalize: Kieren's Story 
Tantalize: Kieren's Story, illustrated by Ming Doyle, is a fully illustrated young adult gothic fantasy graphic novel, published in 2011 by Candlewick Press, for ages 14 and up. Fantasy elements include vampires and shapeshifters. The novel is a genre bender, employing elements of mystery, suspense, comedy, romance, and gothic fantasy. It also was published by Walker Books Australia and New Zealand  and Walker U.K.

Diabolical 
Diabolical is a young adult gothic fantasy novel, published in 2011 by Candlewick Press, for ages 14 and up. Fantasy elements include angels, ghosts, demons, hell hounds, vampires, and shapeshifters. The novel is a genre bender, employing elements of mystery, suspense, comedy, romance, and gothic fantasy. It also was published by Walker Books Australia and New Zealand  and Walker U.K.

Hearts Unbroken 
Hearts Unbroken is a realistic young adult novel, published in 2018 by Candlewick Press, for ages 14 and up.  It also was published by Walker Books Australia and New Zealand. Hearts Unbroken was named a Silver Medal Winner for Young Adult Fiction by Foreword Reviews. In addition, it was named winner of the American Indian Youth Literature Award (Best Young Adult Book) by the American Indian Library Association.

Ancestor Approved: Intertribal Stories for Kids 
Ancestor Approved: Intertribal Stories for Kids is a collection of 18 intersecting short stories and poems set at a powwow, published in 2021 by Heartdrum in partnership with We Need Diverse Books. Cynthia Leitich Smith edited the collection, and also authored the story, Between the Lines, which features characters from her earlier book, Indian Shoes. Featured contributors include: Joseph Bruchac, Art Coulson, Christine Day, Eric Gansworth, Dawn Quigley, Carole Lindstrom, Rebecca Roanhorse, David A. Robertson, Andrea L. Rogers, Kim Rogers, Cynthia Leitich Smith, Monique Gray Smith, Traci Sorell, Tim Tingle, and Brian Young.

Sisters of the Neversea 
Sisters of the Neversea is a middle grade novel, a modern-day re-imagining of Peter Pan, published in 2021 by Heartdrum in partnership with We Need Diverse Books for readers 8 and up. It was also published by HarperCollins Canada and paperback edition published by Harper360 (June 2022), an imprint of HarperCollins UK. Sisters of the Neversea received starred reviews from Kirkus Reviews, Publishers Weekly, School Library Journal, Shelf Awareness and Booklist.

Works

Books
 Jingle Dancer (2000) 
 Rain is Not My Indian Name (2001)
 Indian Shoes (2002)
 Santa Knows (2006)
 Tantalize (2007)
 Eternal (2009)
 Holler Loudly (2010)
 Blessed (2011)
 Tantalize: Kieren's Story (2011)
 Diabolical (2012)
 Feral Nights (2013)
 Eternal: Zachary's Story (2013)
 Feral Curse (2014)
 Feral Pride (2015)
 Hearts Unbroken (2018)
 Ancestor Approved: Intertribal Stories for Kids (2021)
 Sisters of the Neversea (2021)

Short stories, essays and poetry

 "The Gentleman Cowboy" in Period Pieces: Stories for Girls, published by HarperCollins in 2003 for ages 8 and up.
 "The Naked Truth" in In My Grandmother's House: Award-Winning Authors tell Stories about their Grandmothers, published by HarperCollins in 2003 for ages 8 and up.
 "A Real-Live Blonde Cherokee and His Equally Annoyed Soul Mate" in Moccasin Thunder, published by HarperCollins in 2005 for ages 12 and up.
 "Riding With Rosa" in Cicada literary magazine (Vol. 7, No. 4, March/April 2005) for ages 12 and up.
 "Haunted Love" in Immortal: Love Stories with Bite, published by BenBella in 2008 for ages 12 and up.
 "Cat Calls" in Sideshow: Ten Original Tales of Freaks, Illusionists, and Other Matters Odd and Magical, published by Candlewick Press in 2009 for ages 12 and up.
 "The Wrath of Dawn," co-authored by Greg Leitich Smith in Geektastic: Stories from the Nerd Herd, published by Little, Brown in 2009 for ages 12 and up.
 "Isolation" in Dear Bully: Seventy Authors Tell Their Stories, published by HarperCollins in 2011 for ages 13 and up.
 "Mooning Over Broken Stars" in Girl Meets Boy, published by Chronicle in 2012 for ages 12 and up.
 "Friends in Dark Places" in Dear Teen Me, published by Zest in 2012 for ages 12 and up.
 "Cupid's Beaux" in Things I'll Never Say: Stories About Our Secret Selves, published by Candlewick in 2015 for ages 12 and up.
 "All's Well" in Violent Ends, published by Simon Pulse in 2015 for ages 12 and up.
 "Dreams to Write" in Our Story Begins: Your Favorite Authors and Illustrators Share Fun, Inspiring, and Occasionally Ridiculous Things They Wrote and Drew as Kids, published by Atheneum in 2017 for ages 7 and up.
 "Girl's Best Friend" in The Hero Next Door, published by Random House in 2019 for ages 8 and up.
 "Stories for Dinner" in Thanku: Poems of Gratitude, published by Millbrook in 2019 for ages 4 and up.
 "Amazing Auntie Ann" in I Remember: Poems and Pictures of Heritage, published by Lee & Low in 2019 for ages 4 and up.
 "Superhero" in Hop to It: Poems to Get You Moving, published by Pomelo Books in 2020 for ages 4 and up.

See also
 
 List of writers from peoples indigenous to the Americas

References

External links

 
 Cynsations blog
100 Books by Cynthia Leitich Smith at Kirkus Reviews.
CL Smith Interview at BookReviewsAndMore.ca
 

Living people
University of Michigan alumni
Muscogee people
Native American children's writers
Place of birth missing (living people)
Native American poets
American women poets
American children's writers
American women children's writers
1967 births
Native American women writers
American women novelists
20th-century American writers
20th-century American women writers
21st-century American novelists
21st-century American women writers
University of Kansas alumni
Vermont College of Fine Arts faculty
American women academics
20th-century Native Americans
21st-century Native Americans
20th-century Native American women
21st-century Native American women